The 1997 NCAA Division I Men's Swimming and Diving Championships were contested in March 1997 at the University Aquatic Center at the University of Minnesota in Minneapolis, Minnesota at the 74th annual NCAA-sanctioned swim meet to determine the team and individual national champions of Division I men's collegiate swimming and diving in the United States.

Auburn topped the team standings for the first time, finishing 156.5 points ahead of Stanford.

Team standings
Note: Top 10 only
(H) = Hosts
(DC) = Defending champions
Full results

See also
List of college swimming and diving teams

References

NCAA Division I Men's Swimming and Diving Championships
NCAA Division I Swimming And Diving Championships
NCAA Division I Men's Swimming And Diving Championships
NCAA Division I Men's Swimming and Diving Championships